Having a Party is the fourth studio album by American family vocal group the Pointer Sisters, released in 1977 on the ABC/Blue Thumb label.

History
It was a series of lasts for the group in many ways. With youngest member June out for a brief time, the remaining trio of Ruth, Anita and Bonnie recorded the set with June also appearing on the title track (a cover of Sam Cooke's hit). As it turned out, it would be the last album to feature Bonnie, the last album to feature David Rubinson as their producer and the last album the group recorded for Blue Thumb.  Their next album would be on Planet Records, a year later, and would include the return of June Pointer, for a new chapter in the group's career.

Having a Party was remastered and issued on CD in 2006 by Hip-O Select.

Track listing

Personnel 

The Pointer Sisters 
 Anita Pointer, Ruth Pointer, Bonnie Pointer – vocals
 June Pointer – vocals on "Having a Party"

Musicians
 Reginald "Sonny" Burke, Stevie Wonder, Tom Salisbury – keyboards, synthesizers
 Wah Wah Watson, Ray Parker Jr., David T. Walker, Robert Bowles, Chris Michie – guitars
 Louis Johnson, Chuck Domanico, James Jamerson, Willie Weeks, Gene Santini – bass
 James Gadson, Ed Greene, Gaylord Birch – drums
 Kenneth Nash – percussion
 Andy Narell – steel drums
 Ernie Watts – saxophone solos
 Reginald "Sonny" Burke – string arrangements and conductor

Production 
 David Rubinson & Friends, Inc. – producer
 Fred Catero, David Rubinson, Tim Kramer – engineers
 George Horn, Phil Brown – mastering engineers
 Earl Klasky – art direction
 Dave Bhang – album design
 Antonin Kratochvil – photography

Charts

References

External links
 

1977 albums
The Pointer Sisters albums
Albums produced by Dave Rubinson
Albums recorded at Wally Heider Studios
Blue Thumb Records albums